Ershui Station is a railway station of the Taiwan Railways Administration (TRA) West Coast line located in Ershui Township, Changhua County, Taiwan. It is also the western terminus of the Jiji line.

History
Ershui Station was opened on 15 January 1905 as Erbashuei Station (二八水驛), and adopted its current name on 10 January 1920. The current station building was opened in 1935.

Structure
There is one side platform and one island platform.

Taiwan Railways Administration (TRA)
 ⇐ West Coast line ⇒ 
Jiji line ⇒

See also
 List of railway stations in Taiwan

References

Railway stations served by Taiwan Railways Administration
Railway stations in Changhua County